Chisholm Public Schools is a public school district located in Enid, Oklahoma. District enrollment was approximately 900 students in the 2005–2006 school year. It consists of Chisholm Elementary School, Chisholm Middle School, and Chisholm High School.

General information

Location and area
The district covers 87.22 square miles of land.

Within Garfield County and includes portions of northern Enid, all of Carrier, and North Enid. Additionally it has small sections of Alfalfa County and Major County, all unincorporated.

School Board
The school board members are:
President - Andrew Ewbank
Vice President - Danielle Deterding
Clerk - Geri Ayers 
Dustin Baylor
Brendan Atkinson

References

School districts in Oklahoma
Schools in Enid, Oklahoma
Education in Garfield County, Oklahoma
Education in Alfalfa County, Oklahoma
Education in Major County, Oklahoma